Aflah Fadlan Prawira (born 13 November 1997) is an Indonesian swimmer. He competed in the men's 400 metre freestyle event at the 2017 World Aquatics Championships. He also competed in the 2020 Summer Olympics competing in two events but got eliminated in both events.

References

External links
 

1997 births
Living people
Indonesian male freestyle swimmers
People from Cirebon
Swimmers at the 2018 Asian Games
Southeast Asian Games medalists in swimming
Southeast Asian Games silver medalists for Indonesia
Southeast Asian Games bronze medalists for Indonesia
Competitors at the 2017 Southeast Asian Games
Asian Games competitors for Indonesia
Competitors at the 2019 Southeast Asian Games
Islamic Solidarity Games competitors for Indonesia
Islamic Solidarity Games medalists in swimming
Swimmers at the 2020 Summer Olympics
Olympic swimmers of Indonesia
Competitors at the 2021 Southeast Asian Games
21st-century Indonesian people